Alfin Ismail Tuasalamony (born 13 November 1992) is an Indonesian professional footballer who plays as a full-back for Liga 1 club Persikabo 1973. On 30 April 2015, Alfin suffered a broken a double left leg fracture because he was hit by a car after going to the bank, this made him absent from the 2015 Southeast Asian Games and to be out of action for at least one-year.

Career statistics

Club

International

Honours

Club
Persebaya Bhayangkara
 Liga 1: 2017
Sriwijaya
 East Kalimantan Governor Cup: 2018
Arema
 Indonesia President's Cup: 2019
RANS Cilegon
 Liga 2 runner-up: 2021

International
Indonesia U-23
 Islamic Solidarity Games  Silver medal: 2013
 Southeast Asian Games  Silver medal: 2013

References

External links 
 
 

1992 births
Living people
People from Tulehu
Indonesian footballers
Indonesia international footballers
Indonesian expatriate footballers
Expatriate footballers in Belgium
Indonesian expatriate sportspeople in Belgium
Challenger Pro League players
C.S. Visé players
Liga 1 (Indonesia) players
Liga 2 (Indonesia) players
Persebaya Surabaya players
Persija Jakarta players
Bhayangkara F.C. players
Sriwijaya F.C. players
Arema F.C. players
Madura United F.C. players
RANS Nusantara F.C. players
Indonesia youth international footballers
Sportspeople from Maluku (province)
Association football wingers
Association football fullbacks
Footballers at the 2014 Asian Games
Southeast Asian Games silver medalists for Indonesia
Southeast Asian Games medalists in football
Competitors at the 2013 Southeast Asian Games
Asian Games competitors for Indonesia